The 2018 O'Reilly Auto Parts Challenge was the 31st stock car race of the 2018 NASCAR Xfinity Series season, the second race in the Round of 12, and the 18th iteration of the event. The race was held on Saturday, November 3, 2018, in Fort Worth, Texas at Texas Motor Speedway, a 1.5 miles (2.4 km) permanent tri-oval shaped racetrack. The race took the scheduled 200 laps to complete. A wild finish would see Cole Custer of Stewart-Haas Racing with Biagi-DenBeste best JR Motorsports driver Tyler Reddick with a last-lap pass on the backstretch to win his second career NASCAR Xfinity Series race, his first and only win of the season, and a guaranteed spot in the Championship 4. To fill out the podium, Austin Cindric of Team Penske would finish third.

Background 

Texas Motor Speedway is a speedway located in the northernmost portion of the U.S. city of Fort Worth, Texas – the portion located in Denton County, Texas. The track measures 1.5 miles (2.4 km) around and is banked 24 degrees in the turns, and is of the oval design, where the front straightaway juts outward slightly. The track layout is similar to Atlanta Motor Speedway and Charlotte Motor Speedway (formerly Lowe's Motor Speedway). The track is owned by Speedway Motorsports, Inc., the same company that owns Atlanta and Charlotte Motor Speedway, as well as the short-track Bristol Motor Speedway.

Entry list 

*Bilicki would wreck during pre-race activities, and as JP Motorsports had no backup cars, they would withdraw the #55 entry, and move Currey to the #45 entry.

Practice

First practice 
The first practice session was held on Friday, November 2, at 2:05 PM CST, and would last for 45 minutes.

Second and final practice 
The second and final practice session, sometimes referred to as Happy Hour, was held on Friday, November 2, at 4:35 PM CST, and would last for 50 minutes.

Qualifying 
Qualifying was held on Saturday, November 3, at 12:40 PM CST. Since Texas Motor Speedway is under 2 miles (3.2 km), the qualifying system was a multi-car system that included three rounds. The first round was 15 minutes, where every driver would be able to set a lap within the 15 minutes. Then, the second round would consist of the fastest 24 cars in Round 1, and drivers would have 10 minutes to set a lap. Round 3 consisted of the fastest 12 drivers from Round 2, and the drivers would have 5 minutes to set a time. Whoever was fastest in Round 3 would win the pole.

No drivers would fail to qualify.

Full qualifying results

Race results 
Stage 1 Laps: 45

Stage 2 Laps: 45

Stage 3 Laps: 110

References 

2018 NASCAR Xfinity Series
NASCAR races at Texas Motor Speedway
November 2018 sports events in the United States
2018 in sports in Texas